is a football (soccer) club based in Tōmi, located in Nagano Prefecture in Japan. They play in the Hokushinetsu Football League, which is part of Japanese Regional Leagues.

History
The club was founded in 1982 and currently has been managed by a non-profit organization, Artista Dream Project, which took the helm of the club in March 2010. In addition to the top team, Artista features a satellite team (Artista Grande), a junior youth team (Artista JYFC) and a junior team (Artista JFC). From the 2018 season, the club has adopted the new name as "Artista Asama" after the local peak which overlooks the cities of Ueda, Tomi and Saku. In the 2020 season, they appeared in the 2020 Emperor's Cup, being it their first appearance in the competition. They lost their first and only match of the tournament by 3-0 to Niigata University of Health and Welfare.

League & cup record

Key

Honours
Hokushinetsu Football League
Champions (1) : 2016
Hokushinetsu Football League 2nd Division
Champions (1) : 2010
Nagano Prefectural Football League 1st Division
Champions (1) : 2009
Nagano Prefecture Soccer Championship
Champions (1) : 2020

Current squad
Updated to 14 October 2022.

References

External links
Official Site (Japanese)
Official Facebook Page

Football clubs in Japan
Sports teams in Nagano Prefecture
Association football clubs established in 1982
1982 establishments in Japan
Tōmi, Nagano